Nationality words link to articles with information on the nation's poetry or literature (for instance, Irish or France).

Events

 January – Geoffrey Grigson publishes the first issue of New Verse in London (1933–39).
 January–March – New Objectivity movement in German literature and art ends with the fall of the Weimar Republic.
 June – W. H. Auden has his "Vision of Agape".
 May 9 – A. E. Housman delivers his influential Leslie Stephen lecture, "The Name and Nature of Poetry", in Cambridge, asserting that poetry's function is "to transfuse emotion – not to transmit thought but to set up in the reader's sense a vibration corresponding to what was felt by the writer [...]". He criticizes much of the poetry from the 17th and 18th centuries as deficient in this regard, and condemns Alexander Pope's poetry in particular while praising William Collins, Christopher Smart, William Cowper and William Blake.
 Black Mountain College founded in the United States as a progressive, experimental educational institution which attracts poets who become known as the Black Mountain School of poetry.
 Objectivist Press founded.
 Beacon magazine in Trinidad ceases publication (founded in 1931).

Works published in English

Canada
 Leo Kennedy, The Shrouding.
 Wilson MacDonald, Paul Marchand and Other Poems. Guy Ritter illus., Toronto: Pine Tree Publishing.
 Frederick George Scott, Selected Poems.

India, in English
 Lotika Ghose, White Dawns of Awakening ( Poetry in English ), Calcutta: Thacker, Spink and Co.
 Shriman Narayan, The Fountain of Life ( Poetry in English ), Bombay (second edition, Asia Publishing House, 1961)
 Maneck B. Pithawalla, Links with the Past ( Poetry in English ), London: Poetry League
 Mulk Raj Anand, The Golden Breath: Studies in Five Poets of New India, examined Rabindranath Tagore, Mohammad Iqbal, Puran Singh, Sarojini Naidu and Harindranath Chattopadhyay, written in English, India; criticism

United Kingdom
 Valentine Ackland and Sylvia Townsend Warner, Whether a Dove or a Seagull, English poets first published in the United States
 Lazarus Aaronson, Christ in the Synagogue
 W. H. Auden, Poems: Second Edition
 Roy Campbell, Flowering Reeds
 Cecil Day-Lewis, The Magnetic Mountain
 John Drinkwater, Summer Harvest
 Walter de la Mare, The Fleeting, and Other Poems
 T. S. Eliot, The Use of Poetry and the Use of Criticism, 1932-33 Norton lectures at Harvard published in November; lectures he delivers at the University of Virginia are published in 1934 as After Strange Gods
 Eleanor Farjeon, Over the Garden Wall
 John Gawsworth, pen name of Terence Ian Fytton Armstrong, Poems 1930–1932
 Robert Graves, Poems 1930–1933
 A. E. Housman, "The Name and Nature of Poetry", Leslie Stephen Lecture at Cambridge
 D. H. Lawrence, Last Poems
 Herbert Read, The End of a War
 Laura Riding, Poet: a Lying Word
 Vita Sackville-West, Collected Poems
 Siegfried Sassoon, The Road to Ruin
 Stephen Spender, Poems
 W. B. Yeats, Irish poet published in the United Kingdom:
 Collected Poems
 The Winding Stair and Other Poems

United States
 Léonie Adams, This Measure
 Stephen Vincent Benét, with Rosemary Carr Benet, A Book of Americans
 John Peale Bishop, Now with His Love
 Robert P. Tristram Coffin, Ballads of Square-Toed Americans
 Hart Crane, Collected Poems
 E. E. Cummings, EIMI
 Horace Gregory, No Retreat
 Edgar A. Guest, Life's Highway
 Robert Hillyer, Collected Verse
 Robinson Jeffers, Give Your Heart to the Hawks
 Archibald MacLeish:
 Frescos for Mr. Rockefeller's City
 Poems
 Ogden Nash, Happy Days
 Lizette Woodworth Reese, Pastures
 Edwin Arlington Robinson, Talifer
 Sara Teasdale, Strange Victory
 George Oppen, Discrete Series, published by the Objectivist Press
 Ezra Pound, editor, Active Anthology, London; American poet published in the United Kingdom
 Charles Reznikoff, Jerusalem the Golden and In Memoriam: 1933 published by the Objectivist Press
 William Carlos Williams, Collected Poems, Objectivist Press

Twentieth Century Poetry, an Anthology
These poets were chosen by Harold Monro for the 1933 edition:

Lascelles Abercrombie
Richard Aldington
John Alford
A. C. Benson
Laurence Binyon
Edmund Blunden
W. S. Blunt
Gordon Bottomley
Robert Bridges
Rupert Brooke
Samuel Butler
Roy Campbell

G. K. Chesterton
Richard Church
Padraic Colum
A. E. Coppard
Frances Cornford
John Davidson
W. H. Davies
Jeffery Day
Walter de la Mare
Lord Alfred Douglas
John Drinkwater
Helen Parry Eden

T. S. Eliot
Vivian Locke Ellis
Michael Field
J. E. Flecker
F. S. Flint
John Freeman
Stella Gibbons
Wilfrid Gibson
Robert Graves
Thomas Hardy
H. D. (Hilda Doolittle)
Philip Henderson

Maurice Hewlett
Ralph Hodgson
Gerard Manley Hopkins
A. E. Housman
Ford Hueffer
T. E. Hulme
Aldous Huxley
James Joyce
Rudyard Kipling
D. H. Lawrence
Cecil Day-Lewis
John Masefield

R. A. K. Mason
Charlotte Mew
Alice Meynell
Viola Meynell
Harold Monro
T. Sturge Moore
Edwin Muir
Henry Newbolt
Robert Nichols
Alfred Noyes
Wilfred Owen
J. D. C. Pellow

H. D. C. Pepler
Eden Phillpotts
Ezra Pound
Peter Quennell
Herbert Read
Isaac Rosenberg
Siegfried Sassoon
Geoffrey Scott
Edward Shanks
Fredegond Shove
Edith Sitwell
Osbert Sitwell

Sacheverell Sitwell
Stephen Spender
J. C. Squire
James Stephens
Edward Thomas
W. J. Turner
Sylvia Warner
Max Weber
Anna Wickham
Humbert Wolfe
W. B. Yeats

Other in English
 Kenneth Slessor, Australia:
 Darlinghurst Nights: and Morning Glories: Being 47 Strange Sights, Sydney
 Funny Farmyard: Nursery Rhymes and Painting Book, with drawings by Sydney Miller, Sydney: Frank Johnson
 Allen Curnow, Valley of Decision (R.W. Lowry), New Zealand
 William Butler Yeats, The Winding Stair and Other Poems, Irish poet published in the United Kingdom

Works published in other languages

France
 Robert Desnos, Complainte de Fantomas, written for radio
 Jean Follain, La Main chaude, the author's first book of poems
 Pierre Jean Jouve, Sueurs de sang
 Henri Michaux, Un Barbare en Asie
 Marcelin Pleynet, French poet and art critic
 Patrice de La Tour du Pin, La Quête de Joie
 Raymond Queneau, Le Chiendent, a "novel-poem" which won the 1933 Prix des Deux-Magots

Indian subcontinent
Including all of the British colonies that later became India, Pakistan, Bangladesh, Sri Lanka and Nepal. Listed alphabetically by first name, regardless of surname:

 Anandra Chandra Barua:
 Parag, Assamese
 translator, Haphejar Sur, poems by the Persian poet Havij into Assamese
 G. Sankara Kurup, Surykanti, Malayalam, including poems on mystic experiences and platonic love, written in a style strongly influenced by Rabindranath Tagore and Persian poets
 Ghulam Ahmad Fazil Kashmiri, Tarana-e-Fazil, Kashmiri
 Mahavira Prasad Dvivedi Abhinandran Granth, by several authors; an early Hindi example of festschrift honoring an influential editor and arbiter of taste and usage
 Mu. Raghava Ayyankar, Nallicaippulamai Mellryalarkal, largely based on literary sources, an essay on the women poets of the Sangam Age of Tamil literature
 Puttaparthi Narayanacharyulu, Penukonda Lakshmi, said to have been written in 1926 when the author was 12 years old; the poem describes Penukonda, Anantapur, a small town that was once capital of the Vijayanagar empire; Telugu
 Shripada Shastri Hauskar, Sri Sikhaguru-caritamrta, Sanskrit poem on the Sikh gurus
 Sundaram, writing in Gujarati:
 Bhagatni Kadvi Vani
 Kavyamangala
 V. Venkatarajuly Reddiyar, Paranar, a study of Paranar's poems and their relationship to the Sangam Age; Tamil

Spanish language
 Pedro Salinas, La voz a ti debida ("The Voice Owed to You"); Spain
 Emilio Vasquez, Altipampa, Peru
 Emilio Adolfo von Westphalen, Las ínsulas extrañas, Peru

Urdu language
 Mehr Lal Soni Zia Fatehabadi, Tullu (The Dawn), collection of poems of Zia Fatehabadi published by Saghar Nizami, Adabi Markaz, Meerut, India.

Other languages
 Mascha Kaléko, Das Lyrische Stenogrammheft: Verse vom Alltag, Germany
 Nis Petersen, En Drift Vers ("A Drove of Verses"), including "Brændende Europa" ("Europe Aflame"), Denmark
 J. Slauerhoff, Soleares, Netherlands
 Georg Trakl, Gesang des Abgeschiedenen ("Song of The Departed"); an Austrian native's work published in Germany

Awards and honors
 Guggenheim Fellowship: E.E. Cummings
 Pulitzer Prize for Poetry: Archibald MacLeish: Conquistador

Births
Death years link to the corresponding "[year] in poetry" article:
 January 3 – Anne Stevenson (died 2020), American-British poet
 January 16 – Ivan Chtcheglov (died 1998), French political theorist, activist and poet
 January 25 – Alden Nowlan, (died 1983), Canadian poet
 February 5 – B. S. Johnson (Bryan Stanley Johnson; died 1973), English experimental novelist, poet, literary critic and filmmaker
 February 14 – James Simmons (died 2001), Northern Ireland poet, literary critic and songwriter
 February 23 – Donna J. Stone née von Schoenweiler (died 1994), American poet and philanthropist, author of Wielder of Words
 February 24 – Peter Scupham, English
 February 27 – Edward Lucie-Smith, Jamaican-born British poet and art critic
 April 2 – Konstantin Pavlov (died 2008), Bulgarian poet and screenwriter who was defiant against his country's communist regime; when censors prevented his works from being published officially in the country from 1966 to 1976, his popularity didn't wane, as Bulgarians clandestinely copied and read his poems
 April 29 – Rod McKuen (died 2015), American poet and songwriter
 May 12 – Andrei Voznesensky (died 2010), Russian
 June 21 – Gerald William Barrax (died 2019), African-American
 July 18 – Kevin Ireland, New Zealand
 August 1 or April 11 – Ko Un, born Ko Untae, South Korea
 August 16 – Reiner Kunze, German
 September 11 – Robert Fagles (died 2008), American professor, poet and academic, best known for his many translations of ancient Greek Literature
 October 21 – Maureen Duffy, British poet, playwright and novelist
 November 13 – Peter Härtling (died 2017), German novelist and poet
 December 23 – Akihito, Emperor of Japan and poet
 December 26 – Joe Rosenblatt (died 2019), Canada
 Also – Robert Sward, Canadian and American poet, novelist and writer

Deaths
Death years link to the corresponding "[year] in poetry" article:
 January 21 – George Moore (born 1852), Irish poet and novelist
 January 29 – Sara Teasdale (born 1884), American lyric poet
 April 16 – Henry van Dyke (born 1852), American poet, author, educator and clergyman
 April 29 – Constantine P. Cavafy (born 1863), Greek Alexandrine poet
 September 21 – Kenji Miyazawa 宮沢 賢治 (born 1896), early Shōwa period Japanese poet and author of children's literature (surname: Miyazawa)
 November 4 – John Jay Chapman (born 1862), American essayist, poet, author and lawyer
 December 4 – Stefan George (born 1868), German poet and translator

See also

Poetry
 List of poetry awards
 List of years in poetry

Notes

20th-century poetry
Poetry